This is the discography of Vinnie Paz, an American rapper from Philadelphia, Pennsylvania.

Solo albums
 Season of the Assassin (2010)
 God of the Serengeti (2012)
 The Cornerstone of the Corner Store (2016)
 The Pain Collector (2018)
 As Above So Below (2020)
 Burn Everything That Bears Your Name (2021)
 Tortured in the Name of God's Unconditional Love (2022)

Collaboration albums
 Heavy Metal Kings (2011) (with Ill Bill)
 Black God White Devil (2017) (with Ill Bill)
 Camouflage Regime (2019) (with Tragedy Khadafi)

Extended plays
 Prayer for the Assassin (2010)
 Carry on Tradition (2013)

Compilations

 The Essential Collabo Collection Volume 1 (2016)
 The Essential Collabo Collection Volume 2 (2016)

Mixtapes
 Pazmanian Devil (2005)
 The Sound and the Fury (2006)
 Before the Assassin (2010)
 Fires of the Judas Blood (2010)
 The Priest of Bloodshed (2012)
 Digital Dynasty 23 (2013)
 Flawless Victory (2014)

Jedi Mind Tricks
 The Psycho-Social, Chemical, Biological & Electro-Magnetic Manipulation of Human Consciousness (1997)
 Violent by Design (2000)
 Visions of Gandhi (2003)
 Legacy of Blood (2004)
 Servants in Heaven, Kings in Hell (2006)
 A History of Violence (2008)
 Violence Begets Violence (2011)
 The Thief and the Fallen (2015)
 The Bridge and the Abyss (2018)

Army of the Pharaohs
 2006: The Torture Papers
 2007: Ritual of Battle
 2010: The Unholy Terror 
 2014: In Death Reborn
 2014: Heavy Lies the Crown

Guest appearances
Paki Dunn - Tahi (2021)
2. "Can't Believe It" (feat. Vinnie Paz, ill Bill & D.V. Alias Khryst)
Apathy - Honkey Kong (2011)
1. "Honkey Kong" (feat. Vinnie Paz)
15. "Army of the Godz" (feat. Blacastan, Celph Titled, Crypt the Warchild, Esoteric, Motive, Planetary, Reef the Lost Cauze, and Vinnie Paz)
Diabolic - Liar & A Thief (2010)
10. "Not Again" (feat. Vinnie Paz)
OuterSpace - Blood and Ashes (2004)
13. "Blades of Glory" (feat. Vinnie Paz)
OuterSpace - Blood Brothers (2006)
7. "Silence" (feat. Vinnie Paz)
14. "Brute Force 2" (feat. Vinnie Paz)
OuterSpace - God's Fury (2008)
13. "The Killing Fields" (feat. Vinnie Paz)
OuterSpace - My Brother's Keeper (2011)
2. "Mossberg Solution" (feat. Vinnie Paz)
Ill Bill & DJ Muggs - Kill Devil Hills (2010)
15. "Kill Devil Hills" (feat. B-Real and Vinnie Paz)
Ill Bill - The Hour of Reprisal (2008)
4. "A Bullet Never Lies" (feat. Vinnie Paz)
La Coka Nostra - Masters of the Dark Arts (2012)
1. "My Universe" (feat. Vinnie Paz)
11. "Coka Kings" (feat. Vinnie Paz)
Slaine - A World with No Skies (2011)
9. "Landscapes" (feat. Reef the Lost Cauze and Vinnie Paz)
Brothers of the Stone - Brothers of the Stone (2013)
9. "Meditation" (feat. Vinnie Paz)
Mr. Green - Live from the Streets (2015)
9. "If I Don't Go to Hell" (feat. Pace Won and Vinnie Paz)
La Coka Nostra - To Thine Own Self Be True (2016)
7. "Crispy Innovators" (feat. Vinnie Paz)
Czarface & MF Doom - Czarface Meets Metal Face (2018)
11. "Astral Projecting" (feat. Vinnie Paz)
Stray from the Path - "Only Death Is Real" (2017
9. "The House Always Wins" (feat. Vinnie Paz)
Terror - "Rhythm Amongst the Chaos" (2007)
5. "Kickback"
Terror - "Total Retaliation" (2018)
8. "Post Armageddon Interlude"
Freddy Madball - "Catholc Guilt (2009)
5. "Dark of the Knight" (feat. Vinnie Paz)

References

Hip hop discographies
Discographies of American artists